Christopher Richard Stein,  (born 4 January 1947) is an English celebrity chef, restaurateur, writer and television presenter. Along with business partner (and first wife) Jill Stein, he has run the Stein hotel and restaurant business in the UK. The business has a number of renowned restaurants, shops and hotels in Padstow along with other restaurants in Marlborough, Winchester and Barnes. He is also the head chef and a co-owner of the "Rick Stein at Bannisters" restaurants in Mollymook and Port Stephens in Australia, with his second wife, Sarah. He has written cookery books and presented television programmes.

Early years
Of German descent, Christopher Richard Stein was born on 4 January 1947 in Churchill, Oxfordshire, to Eric and Dorothy Stein. He was born and brought up on a farm.

Stein was educated at Wells Court, a preparatory school just outside Tewkesbury, then Wells House, the Court's bigger sister-school at Malvern Wells, and then Uppingham School. He took A-levels in English, history and geography, but failed all of them. He moved to a cram school in Brighton, gaining E grades in English and history.

Stein partially completed a hotel management traineeship with British Transport Hotels at its Great Western Royal Hotel in Paddington. He worked there as a chef for six months. Distraught by his father's suicide, at age 19 he went to Australia, where he worked as a labourer in an abattoir and as a clerk in a naval dockyard. He travelled to New Zealand and Mexico around that time to "take some time out".

Being on his own, he read widely, reflected on his attitude to education, and applied successfully to New College, Oxford, where he earned an English degree in 1971. Shortly after that, he moved to Padstow.

Career

After graduating, Stein converted a mobile disco in Padstow, which he had run as a student, into a quayside nightclub with his friend, Johnny. It became known for its freeze-dried curries. However, the nightclub lost its licence and was closed down by the police, mainly due to frequent brawls with local fishermen. The pair still had a licence for a restaurant in another part of the building, so they continued with that to avert bankruptcy. Stein ran the kitchen using the experience he had gained as a commis chef. Eventually he converted it into a small harbour-side bistro, The Seafood Restaurant, with his first wife Jill in 1975. , his business operates four restaurants, a bistro, a café, a seafood delicatessen, a pâtisserie shop, a gift shop and a cookery school. In 2007, threats against Stein's businesses were made by Cornish nationalists. His impact on the economy of Padstow is such that it has been nicknamed "Padstein".

In 2009, Stein made his first acquisition in the nearby village of St Merryn, 3½ miles from Padstow, taking over the Cornish Arms public house on the village's outskirts, intending to keep it as a traditional Cornish pub.

In October 2009, Stein and his future second wife (fiancée at the time), the publicist Sarah Burns, opened Rick Stein at Bannisters in Mollymook, Australia. Stein said at the time of opening, "Ever since a memorable weekend eating Pambula oysters and flathead in Merimbula in the sixties, I've had the image of the clean blue sea and sweet seafood of the South Coast fixed in my head so when I was introduced to Mollymook about six years ago I knew that one day I would open up a restaurant celebrating local fish and shellfish but keeping it really simple."

In 2018, Stein opened a second Rick Stein at Bannisters in Salamander Bay in Port Stephens, with his second wife, Sarah. Stein has become a popular television presenter on food programmes. After appearing once as a guest chef in Keith Floyd's 1985 series Floyd on Fish and in his 1986 series Floyd on Food, he was offered the chance to present his own series – like the "travelogue" style of cookery show pioneered by Floyd – on BBC television, using Floyd's producer and director David Pritchard. This caused some rivalry, even feud, only resolved shortly before Floyd's death. His shows have included Rick Stein's Taste of the Sea, Fruits of the Sea, Seafood Odyssey, Fresh Food, Seafood Lovers' Guide, Food Heroes, French Odyssey, Mediterranean Escapes, Far Eastern Odyssey, Rick Stein's Spain and Rick Stein's India. In the last five series, he set out in search of the best in the region's foods.

Stein was often accompanied by his Jack Russell terrier, Chalky, until his death in 2007. So popular was Chalky that Sharp's Brewery named two speciality beers after him, and an early day motion was tabled in the British House of Commons lamenting his death, which only gathered three other signatories.

Much of Stein's television work has been released on VHS tape or DVD, but the BBC has yet to release some of the early pioneering series. Since late 2018, however, much has been licensed to the Good Food cable TV channel, where it has been broadcast with some heavy editing (and therefore omitting up to 20% of the original broadcast footage) to allow for the inclusion of commercials.

A book has accompanied each series, and Stein's book English Seafood Cookery won the Glenfiddich Award for Food Book of the Year in 1989. Stein was awarded the OBE in the 2003 New Year Honours for services to tourism in Cornwall and the CBE in the 2018 New Year Honours for services to the economy.

On 22 June 2020, it was confirmed that Stein's restaurant in Porthleven, Cornwall would close permanently due to the COVID-19 pandemic. The restaurant had been closed since March 2020. In July, it was announced that chef Michael Caines would take over the restaurant.

Personal life

In 1965, when Stein was 18, his father, a retired managing director of The Distillers Company, killed himself by jumping from a cliff, near the family's holiday home at Trevose Head, after suffering from bipolar disorder.

Stein met his first wife Jill Newstead in Padstow. They married in 1975 and set up their restaurant and hotel business. Stein has three sons with Jill: Edward, Jack, and Charles who are involved in the family business.

Stein met Sarah Burns, 20 years his junior, in Australia in 1997, when she was a publicity manager for Australia Gourmet Traveller magazine. He and Burns had a five-year affair before Jill found out and then divorced Stein in 2007, but agreed to continue to run the business together. Stein and Burns married on 7 October 2011.

Stein has a brother, John, and a sister, Henrietta. He also has a half-brother, Jeremy, his mother's son from her first marriage. He is the uncle of DJ and music producer Judge Jules.

Charity work
Stein is patron of the charities Padstow Youth Project, South West PESCA (Duchy Fish Quota Co.), the National Mission for Deep Sea Fishermen, the National Coastwatch Institution, the Dyslexia Research Trust, and The National Trust.

Restaurants owned or operated by Rick Stein

England

Australia

Publications
 English Seafood Cookery, 1988 – Glenfiddich Cook Book of the Year 1989
 A Beginner's Guide to Seafood, 1992 (Chapter 4 Marine Cuisine Guides)
 Beach to Belly, 1994 (foreword)
 Taste of the Sea, 1995 – André Simon Cook Book of the Year 1996
 Good Food Award Best Cookery Book, 1995/1996
 Rick Stein Fish, 10 Recipes, 1996
 Fruits of the Sea, 1997
 Rick Stein's Seafood Odyssey, 1999
 Rick Stein's Seafood Lovers' Guide, 2000
 Rick Stein's Seafood, 2001 - Gourmand World Cookbook Awards, 2001 – winner of category: Best Seafood and Fish in English; Best in the World Fish and Seafood (German translation – Gold medal – Gastronomische Akademie Deutschland 2003)
 My Favourite Seafood Recipes, 2002 (Marks and Spencer cookery book)
 Rick Stein's Food Heroes, 2002 – Gourmand World Cookbook Awards 2002 – winner of category: Best Local Cookery Book; Best Cookery Book of the Year in Great Britain / Jacob's Creek World Food Media Awards 2003: Silver for best hardcover recipe book
 Rick Stein's Guide to the Food Heroes of Britain, 2003 – Gourmand World Cookbook Awards 2003 – winner of category: Best Guide
 Rick Stein's Food Heroes, Another Helping, 2004
 Rick Stein's Complete Seafood – winner of the James Beard Foundation Award 2005 for Cook Book of the Year
 Rick Stein's French Odyssey, 2005
 Rick Stein's Mediterranean Escapes, 2007
 Rick Stein Coast to Coast, 2008
 Rick Stein's Far Eastern Odyssey, 2009
 My Kitchen Table: Rick Stein's 100 Fish and Seafood Recipes, 2011
 Rick Stein's Spain, 2011
 Rick Stein's India, 2013
 Under a Mackerel Sky: A Memoir, 2013
 Rick Stein's Long Weekends, 2016
 The road to Mexico, 2017
 Rick Stein's Secret France, 2019
 Rick Stein at Home, 2021

TV
 Floyd on Fish, BBC TV, 1985 (Stein's first television appearance – Keith Floyd called him Nick several times)
 Floyd on Food, BBC TV, 1986
 Farmhouse Kitchen, Yorkshire Television, two episodes, 1989 and 1990
 Taste of the Sea, BBC TV, 1995. 6 episodes – Glenfiddich TV Programme of the Year Award, Good Food Award Television Cookery Programme of the Year
 Fruits of the Sea, BBC TV, 1997. 8 episodes – Silver Medal World Food Media Awards Adelaide 1997
 Great Railway Journeys, BBC TV, 1999 (Los Mochis to Veracruz)
 Rick Stein's Seafood Odyssey, BBC TV, 1999. 8 episodes – Bronze Medal World Food Media Awards Adelaide 1999
 Fresh Food, BBC TV, 1999. 6 episodes
 Personal Passions, BBC TV, 1999
 Food and Drink, BBC TV, 1999 – Gold Award for Best Television Food Segment Within a Show: World Food Media Awards Adelaide 1999
 Rick Stein's Seafood Lovers' Guide, BBC TV, 2000. 8 episodes – Glenfiddich TV Programme of the Year Award 2001
 Jacob's Creek World Food Media Awards: Silver for best Television Food Show
 Friends for Dinner, BBC TV, 2000
 Rick Stein on Fishing, ITV, 2001
 Rick Stein's Food Heroes, BBC TV, 2002. 10 episodes – Jacob's Creek World Food Media Awards 2003: Gold for Best Television Food Show
 Rick Stein's Food Heroes, Another Helping, Series 1, BBC TV, October 2003. 6 episodes
 Rick Stein's Food Heroes, Another Helping, Series 2, BBC TV, February 2004. 8 episodes
 Rick Stein's Fish Love, UKTV Fish, August 2004
 Rick Stein's French Odyssey, BBC TV, May 2005. 10 episodes 
 Cabin Fever (Behind the scenes and the making of Rick Stein's French Odyssey), BBC TV, Autumn 2005. single 1-hour programme.
 Rick Stein's Food Heroes Christmas Special, BBC TV, December 2005. 2 half-hour episodes, also aired as a 1-hour programme.
 Betjeman and Me: Rick Stein's Story, August 2006
 Rick Stein and the Japanese Ambassador, BBC Two, 2006
 Rick Stein in Du Maurier Country, BBC Two, May 2007
 Fishy Treats and Simple Eats, Japanese Food Network, Autumn 2007
 Rick Stein's Mediterranean Escape, BBC Two, 8 August 2007. 6 episodes
 Rick Stein's Memoirs of a Seafood Chef, BBC Two, 7 January 2009
 Who Do You Think You Are?, BBC TV, 16 February 2009
 Rick Stein's Far Eastern Odyssey, BBC Two, July 2009. 6 episodes
 Rick Stein's Christmas Odyssey, BBC Two, December 2009
 Rick Stein's Food of the Italian Opera, BBC HD, June 2010
 Rick Stein's Cornish Christmas, BBC Two, December 2010
 Rick Stein's Spain, BBC Two, July 2011. 4 episodes
 Rick Stein Tastes The Blues, BBC Four, November 2011
 Rick Stein's Spanish Christmas, BBC Two, December 2011
 Rick Stein's India, BBC Two, June 2013. 6 episodes
 Rick Stein's German Bite, BBC Two, August 2013 (Also referred to as The German Odyssey)
 Rick Stein: From Venice to Istanbul, BBC Two, August 2015. 7 episodes
 A Cook Abroad, BBC Two, 2 March 2015 (episode 5: Rick Stein's Australia)
 Rick Stein's Taste of Shanghai, BBC Two, February 2016
 Rick Stein's Long Weekends, BBC Two, May 2016. 10 episodes
 Rick Stein's Road to Mexico, BBC Two, November 2017. 7 Episodes
 Talking Books, BBC 2018
 Rick Stein's Secret France, BBC Two, Autumn 2019. 6 Episodes
 Pointless Celebrities, BBC One, 28 November 2020
 Rick Stein's Cornwall, BBC Two, January 2021. 15 Episodes
 Rick Stein's Cornwall Series 2, BBC Two, 2022. 10 Episodes
 Rick Stein's Cornwall Series 3, BBC Two, 2023. Number of episodes TBA

DVD / VHS
 Rick Stein Cooks Fish (1997 VHS, re-issued as a bonus on Seafood Odyssey DVD)
 Rick Stein's Taste of the Sea (1999 VHS release of 1995 broadcast)
 Rick Stein's Seafood Odyssey (1999 VHS & 2005 DVD)
 Rick Stein's Seafood Lovers Guide (2001 VHS)
 Rick Stein's Food Heroes (2003 VHS & 2005 DVD. DVD release also includes the six episodes of Rick Stein's Food Heroes, Another Helping, Series 1.)
 Rick Stein's French Odyssey (2007 DVD)
 Rick Stein's Mediterranean Escapes (2009 DVD)
 Rick Stein's Far Eastern Odyssey (2010 DVD)
 Rick Stein's Spain (2011 DVD)
 Rick Stein's India (2013 DVD)
 Rick Stein's Venice To Istanbul (2015 DVD)
 Rick Stein's Tastes of the World: From Cornwall to Shanghai (2016 DVD - a compilation of six individual broadcasts: Rick Stein's Taste of Shanghai, Rick Stein's German Odyssey, Rick Stein & The Japanese Ambassador Rick Stein Tastes the Blues, Rick Stein's Taste of the Italian Opera, Rick Stein's Cornish Christmas)
 Rick Stein's Long Weekends (2017 DVD)
 Rick Stein's Mexico (2018 DVD)
 Rick Stein's Secret France (2019 DVD)

Other awards

For the restaurant:
 RAC/The Sunday Times Taste of Britain Best Restaurant Award 1984
 Decanter Magazine Restaurant of the Year 1989
 The Good Hotel Guide Cesar Award 1995
 Egon Ronay's Guide Restaurant of the Year 1996
 Hotel & Restaurant Magazine Seafood Restaurant of the Year 1998, 1999, 2000, 2001 & 2003
 The AA Award – English Seafood Restaurant of the Year Award 2002

For the man:
 The Good Food Award Television and Radio Personality – 1995/1996
 The England for Excellence Awards – Outstanding Contribution to Tourism Award – 1988–1998
 Caterer and Hotelkeeper 1999 Chef Award – Chef of the Year The Catey Awards
 AA Guide Chefs' Chef of the Year 1999–2000
 Waterford Wedgwood Hospitality Award – 1999
 The Glenfiddich Trophy – 2001
 The Cornwall Tourist Award – A special award for outstanding services to Cornwall 2002
 OBE – 2003 New Year Honours: For services to tourism in Cornwall
 CatererSearch 100 – 14th most influential chef in UK in 2005
 In 2012, Stein was among the British cultural icons selected by pop artist Sir Peter Blake to appear in a new version of his most famous artwork – the Beatles' Sgt. Pepper's Lonely Hearts Club Band album cover – to celebrate the British cultural figures of the last six decades.
 5 July 2016, Rick and Jill Stein received the Special Award at the prestigious Catey Awards, for their more than 41 years of outstanding contribution to the hospitality industry.
 CBE – 2018 New Year Honours: For services to the economy

References

External links

 
 
 Interview with Rick Stein – RadioLIVE New Zealand, June 2010.

1947 births
20th-century English businesspeople
20th-century English male writers
20th-century English non-fiction writers
21st-century English businesspeople
21st-century English male writers
21st-century English non-fiction writers
Alumni of New College, Oxford
BBC television presenters
British hoteliers
Chefs of French cuisine
Commanders of the Order of the British Empire
Cornish people
English chefs
English cookbook writers
English documentary filmmakers
English expatriates in Australia
English food writers
English memoirists
English people of German descent
English restaurateurs
English television chefs
English television presenters
James Beard Foundation Award winners
Living people
Officers of the Order of the British Empire
People associated with Malvern, Worcestershire
People educated at Uppingham School
People from Oxfordshire (before 1974)
People from West Oxfordshire District
Restaurant founders
Writers from Oxfordshire
British restaurateurs